The 2013 Championship Cup, (known for commercial reasons as the Northern Rail Cup), was the 12th and last season of the rugby league football competition for clubs in Great Britain's Championship and Championship 1.

Leigh beat Sheffield 43-28 in the final, which was played at Halifax's The Shay.

Format 
For 2013, the format of the competition was changed to coincide with the expansion of the Championship from 10 to 14 teams. The competition began on 3 March with a group stage containing eight teams from the 2013 Championship 1 split into two groups. Each team played four games (two home, two away) with three of the games being played against the other teams in the group and the fourth game being played against a team from the other group.

Following the completion of the group stage, the teams finishing first in each group progressed to the knock-out stages where they join the 14 teams from the Championship to make up 16 teams. There were three knock-out rounds (play-off, quarter final, semi final) before the final on 20 July 2013 at The Shay in Halifax. The final took place after the inaugural Northern Rail Bowl final, involving the two highest-ranked teams from the group stages.

2013 Competition Results

Group stage

Round 1

Round 2

Round 3

Round 4

Tables

Tables are correct as of 23 April 2013.
Source: rugbyleaguechampionships.co.uk and BBC Sport.

Classification: 1st on competition points; 2nd on match points difference.
Competition Points: For win = 3; For draw = 2; For loss by 12 points or fewer = 1

Knock-out Stages

Finals Tournament Bracket

Play Off Round

Quarter-final

Semi-final

Finals

Notes
A. Game switched from Thunderdome to Craven Park due to Stan Calvert Cup match between Northumbria University and Newcastle University 
B. Game switched from Thunderdome to Blaydon RFC due to poor conditions of pitch at Gateshead 
C. Match originally postponed on 24 March due to snow

References

External links
 RFL website
 Northern Rail Cup website
 Northern Rail website

National League Cup
Championship Cup
2013 in Welsh rugby league